G-protein coupled receptor family C group 5 member D is a protein that in humans is encoded by the GPRC5D gene.

Function 

The protein encoded by this gene is a member of the G protein-coupled receptor family; however, the specific function of this gene has not yet been determined.

See also
 Retinoic acid-inducible orphan G protein-coupled receptor

References

Further reading

G protein-coupled receptors